NA-155 Lodhran-II is a constituency for the National Assembly of Pakistan. It mainly comprises the Lodhran Tehsil along with some areas of the Dunyapur Tehsil.

Election 2002 

General elections were held on 10 Oct 2002. Nawab Aman Ullah Khan of PML-Q won by 94,651 votes.

Election 2008 

General elections were held on 18 Feb 2008. Muhammad Siddique Khan Baloch of PML-Q won by 81,983 votes.

Election 2013 

General elections were held on 11 May 2013. Muhammad Siddique Khan Baloch (independent candidate) won by securing 86,177 votes and became the  member of National Assembly. Jahangeer Khan Tareen (Pakistan Tehreek-e-Insaf) got 72,089 votes. Syed Muhammad Rafi Ud Din Bukhari (PML N) was third with 45,406 votes.

By-election 2015
A by-election was held in this constituency after the disqualification of Muhammad Siddique Khan Baloch due to rigging allegations.

Pakistan Tehreek-e-Insaf Secretary General Jahangir Khan Tareen won this seat with 138719 votes, while PML-N's Siddique Khan Baloch came second with 99,933 votes.

By-election 2018 

Following the disqualification of Jehangir Khan Tareen, Secretary General of Pakistan Tehreek-e-Insaf was denotified of his seat. A subsequent by-election was held on February 12.

Iqbal Shah of Pakistan Muslim League (N) won this bye-election with over 113,850 votes. This was seen as a major upset for the Pakistan Tehreek-e-Insaf, as Lodhran had been seen as one of their strongholds after the 2015 by-election.

Election 2018 

General elections were held on 25 July 2018.

See also
NA-154 Lodhran-I
NA-156 Vehari-I

References

External links 
Election result's official website

Lodhran
NA-154